Cuvette-Ouest (or Western Cuvette) is a department of the Republic of the Congo in the western part of the country. Cuvette-Ouest is the least populated department in the country. It borders the departments of Cuvette and Sangha, and Gabon. The capital is Ewo. Principal cities and towns include Kelle.

Cuvette-Ouest has been the site of several outbreaks of the Ebola virus.

Administrative divisions 
Cuvette-Ouest Department is divided into one commune and six districts:

Districts 
 Ewo District
 Kelle District
 Mbomo District
 Okoyo District
 Etoumbi District
 Mbama District

Communes 
 Ewo Commune

References

Republic of the Congo at GeoHive

 
Departments of the Republic of the Congo